Annakin or Anakin is a given name and surname of Germanic origin. The name means "son of Anno" or “Son of the Eagle”. Anno is a variant of the Old High German given name "Arno" which means Eagle. Notable people with the surname include:
 Chris Annakin (born 1991), British rugby league footballer
 Ken Annakin (1914–2009), British film director
 Doug Anakin (1930–2020), Canadian bobsleigher

See also
 Anakin (disambiguation)
 Heinecken
 Heineken (surname)
 Hankin

References